Metsovitikos is a kind of a local folk dance from Metsovo, Greece.

See also
Music of Greece
Greek dances

References
Vlahoi.net - Μετσοβίτικος xoρόs

Greek dances